Barnsley Central is a constituency in South Yorkshire represented in the House of Commons of the UK Parliament since 2011 by Dan Jarvis of the Labour Party.

Constituency profile
Barnsley Central is generally an urban seat and has a large majority of its population on middle or low incomes, with most of the large former mining town's social housing contained within it. It has been held by the Labour Party since 1983 and was consistently a safe seat, like its main predecessor, until 2019, when Labour's majority was cut to 9.7%.

History
Created in 1983, Barnsley Central covers a similar area to that of the former Barnsley constituency.  The seat was held by almost a year from May 2010 by Eric Illsley as an independent MP after he was suspended from the Labour party over the expenses row and he led to its becoming vacant on 8 February 2011.

On 12 January 2011 having admitted the crime of fraud over his expenses, Illsley announced the intention to stand down from Parliament, necessitating a by-election in early 2011.  On 8 February 2011 Ilsley resigned his seat before he was due to be sentenced for fraudulently claiming parliamentary expenses. The by-election was held on 3 March 2011 and was won by Dan Jarvis for the Labour Party.  The Labour majority and share of the vote rose to give an absolute majority, on a turnout 20% lower than in the General Election; meanwhile the Conservative share of the vote fell steeply to just 8.3%, less than UKIP's 12.2% vote-share. In the 2019 general election, Jarvis held onto his seat, but with a sharply reduced majority; it fell from 15,546 to 3,571. The Brexit Party came second with 11,233 votes, which was 30.4% of the vote, compared to Jarvis's 40.1%.

Boundaries

1983–1997: The Borough of Barnsley wards of Ardsley, Athersley, Central, Monk Bretton, North West, Royston, and South West.

1997–2010: The Borough of Barnsley wards of Ardsley, Athersley, Central, Cudworth, Monk Bretton, North West, Royston, and South West.

2010–present: The Borough of Barnsley wards of Central, Darton East, Darton West, Kingstone, Monk Bretton, Old Town, Royston, and St Helens.

Barnsley Central constituency covers most of the town of Barnsley. It is bordered by the constituencies of Wakefield, Hemsworth, Barnsley East, and Penistone and Stocksbridge.

Members of Parliament
The constituency has had three Members of Parliament since its creation in 1983, all of whom have been from the Labour Party.

Elections

Elections of the 2010s 

This was the highest Brexit Party vote share at the 2019 general election. It was also the highest vote share for any non Labour candidate in the seat's history.

Elections of the 2000s

Elections of the 1990s

Elections of the 1980s

See also
List of parliamentary constituencies in South Yorkshire

Notes

References

Sources 
Guardian Unlimited Politics (Election results from 1992 to the present)

Parliamentary constituencies in Yorkshire and the Humber
Constituencies of the Parliament of the United Kingdom established in 1983
Politics of Barnsley